I've Got a Horse is a 1938 British comedy film directed by Herbert Smith and starring Sandy Powell, Norah Howard and Felix Aylmer.

Plot
Sandy accepts a racehorse called Lightning as settlement for a bad debt. When he enters the horse in a race and it starts doing circus tricks and loses the competition, Sandy realises the animal's future and his own lie in the circus.

Cast
 Sandy Powell as Sandy  
 Norah Howard as Alice  
 Felix Aylmer as Lovatt  
 Evelyn Roberts as Thomas  
 Leo Franklyn as Joe  
 D. A. Clarke-Smith as Fowler, Kings Counsel  
 Kathleen Harrison as Mabel  
 Edward Chapman as George  
 Wilfrid Hyde-White as Police Constable  
 Frank Atkinson as Bunker

References

Bibliography
 Low, Rachael. Filmmaking in 1930s Britain. George Allen & Unwin, 1985.
 Wood, Linda. British Films, 1927-1939. British Film Institute, 1986.

External links

1938 films
Films directed by Herbert Smith
1938 comedy films
British comedy films
Films shot at Beaconsfield Studios
British Lion Films films
British black-and-white films
1930s English-language films
1930s British films